Aleksandr Olegovich Kornelyuk (born 28 June 1950 in Baku) was a Soviet athlete who competed mainly in the 100 metres. He trained at Dynamo in Moscow.

Kornelyuk began athletics in 1963 and became a member of the USSR National Team in 1970. He competed for the USSR in the 1972 Summer Olympics held in Munich, Germany in the 4 × 100 metre relay where he won the silver medal with his team mates Vladimir Lovetskiy, Juris Silovs and Valeriy Borzov. Kornelyuk also won a 50 m silver medal at the 1972 European Indoor Championships behind his teammate Borzov.

In 1972 Kornelyuk was awarded the Medal For Labour Heroism.

References

Azerbaijani male sprinters
Soviet male sprinters
Dynamo sports society athletes
Olympic silver medalists for the Soviet Union
Athletes (track and field) at the 1972 Summer Olympics
Olympic athletes of the Soviet Union
Sportspeople from Baku
1950 births
Living people
Medalists at the 1972 Summer Olympics
Olympic silver medalists in athletics (track and field)
Universiade bronze medalists for the Soviet Union
Universiade medalists in athletics (track and field)
Medalists at the 1970 Summer Universiade